The Primetime Emmy Award for Outstanding Cinematography for a Nonfiction Program is awarded to one television documentary or nonfiction series each year.

In the following list, the first titles listed in gold are the winners; those not in gold are nominees, which are listed in alphabetical order. The years given are those in which the ceremonies took place:

Winners and nominations

1970s

1980s

1990s

2000s

2010s

2020s

Programs with multiple nominations

7 nominations
 Anthony Bourdain: Parts Unknown

4 nominations
 Whale Wars

3 nominations
 American Experience
 Our Planet
 This American Life

2 nominations
 Blue Planet II
 Chef's Table
 Meerkat Manor
 Planet Earth II

Notes

References

Cinematography for a Nonfiction Program